Belgium Park may refer to:

 Belgium Park, in the main campus of Mekelle University, Ethiopia
 Nickname of Monaghan United F.C., a soccer club in Ireland